Pioneer State High School is a government co-educational secondary school (7-12) in Andergrove, Mackay, Queensland, Australia.

History 
The school was established on 28 January 1986.

References

External links
 

Public high schools in Queensland
Schools in Mackay, Queensland
Educational institutions established in 1989
1989 establishments in Australia